The Boston Tea Party was a 1773 colonial protest action which presaged the American Revolution.
      
Boston Tea Party may also refer to:
 Boston Tea Party (political party), a libertarian U.S. political party founded in 2006
 Boston Tea Party (café chain), a chain of cafés in England
 Boston Tea Party (concert venue), a concert venue in Boston, Massachusetts, during the late 1960s
 Boston Tea Party (TV series), a Swedish TV show
The Boston Tea Party (1908 film), a film by Edwin S. Porter
The Boston Tea Party (1915 film), a film by Eugene Nowland
The Boston Tea Party, a 1934 film narrated by John B. Kennedy
 Boston Tea Party, an educational Disney film excerpted from Johnny Tremain
 The Boston Tea Party, a 1976 play by Allan Albert
 "Boston Tea Party", a song by the Sensational Alex Harvey Band from SAHB Stories

See also 
 Boston T. Party or Kenneth W. Royce, American libertarian author
 Tea party (disambiguation)
 Tea Party protests, a series of hundreds of protests first organized in 2009